Currie Graham (born February 26, 1967) is a Canadian stage, film and television actor. While primarily recognized as a TV actor, he has numerous film credits, including the action thrillers Rancid (2004) and Assault on Precinct 13 (2005).

Early life and education
Graham grew up in Ontario, Canada. Currie is his mother's maiden name. He attended Algonquin Public School and Maynard Public School. His family relocated from Algonquin, Ontario to Cardinal, Ontario. He attended South Grenville District High School in Prescott, Ontario. He studied acting at the American Academy of Dramatic Arts in New York City.

Film and TV work
Currie may be best known for playing Lt. Thomas Bale, the micromanaging detective squad commander in the final season of the TV program NYPD Blue, having earlier made an appearance in season 4 playing a small-time criminal. His other regular starring TV appearances include the final season of the TV program Suddenly Susan as the male lead/romantic interest Nate Knaborski.

Graham has established a career in television via multiple guest-starring roles, including recurring roles in House as the husband of Dr. House's ex-girlfriend Stacy (Sela Ward), The Mentalist as Walter Mashburn, Weeds as Vince, 24 as Ted Cofell, Boston Legal as ADA Frank Ginsberg, Desperate Housewives as Lynette Scavo's boss, Ed Ferrara, Criminal Minds as Viper, in the episode titled "52 Pickup" and in Men in Trees as Supervisor Richard Ellis, the romantic interest of local chief of police Celia Bachelor. Other guest appearances include Over There (Season 1, Episode 10) as Corporal Shaver, and roles on the TV programs Judging Amy, Patrick Lehane on the TV Mini-Series Would Be Kings and CSI. Graham also appeared in one episode of ER.

At the 19th Gemini Awards in 2004, Graham received a nomination for Best Performance by an Actor in a Featured Supporting Role for his portrayal of Constable Robert Cross in the 2003 TV film Cowboys and Indians: The J.J. Harper Story.
 
In 2008, he appeared as IOA agent James Marrick in the direct-to-DVD film Stargate: The Ark of Truth, a film conclusion of the Stargate SG-1 television franchise. He previously starred as Nick Balco in the TNT series Raising the Bar. Previously, he has appeared in the pilot episode of Brimstone as Det. William Kane, in the Season 4 premiere of Private Practice alongside French Stewart, and had a recurring role in Dallas.

Currie has appeared in a handful of films.  His credits include minor roles in Hitchcock (2012) and the 2012 remake of Total Recall, as well as a supporting role in Pompeii (2014).  

In 2015, he appeared as Mike Sherman in an episode of Mad Men. In 2016, he appeared as Calvin Chadwick in season two of Marvel's Agent Carter. In 2016, he joined the cast of the HBO series Westworld. He also appeared in USS Indianapolis: Men of Courage as the prosecutor in Captain McVay's court martial. In 2018, he had a recurring role as Ben McRee, a longtime friend of the titular character in The Rookie. In 2022 he had a recurring role in the Amazon Prime Video series Reacher as the villain Kliner Sr.

Filmography

Films

Television

Web

References

External links
 

1967 births
Living people
Canadian male film actors
Canadian male television actors
American Academy of Dramatic Arts alumni
Male actors from Hamilton, Ontario
21st-century Canadian male actors
20th-century Canadian male actors
Canadian expatriate male actors in the United States